Leandro Becerra (born 26 January 1984, in Cordoba)  is an Argentine footballer who play for Deportivo Madryn.

Career
In May 2015, Becerra was awarded $230,000 from FK Baku by FIFA over unfulfilled contract obligations.

Career statistics

References

External links

1984 births
Living people
Argentine footballers
Argentine expatriate footballers
Super League Greece players
Cypriot First Division players
Argentine Primera División players
Primera Nacional players
Club Atlético Belgrano footballers
San Martín de San Juan footballers
Tiro Federal footballers
Atlético Tucumán footballers
PAS Giannina F.C. players
FC Baku players
Anorthosis Famagusta F.C. players
Defensa y Justicia footballers
Club Atlético Patronato footballers
Central Córdoba de Santiago del Estero footballers
Gimnasia y Esgrima de Mendoza footballers
Deportivo Madryn players
Argentine expatriate sportspeople in Greece
Argentine expatriate sportspeople in Cyprus
Expatriate footballers in Greece
Expatriate footballers in Cyprus
Expatriate footballers in Azerbaijan
Association football midfielders
Argentine expatriate sportspeople in Azerbaijan
Footballers from Córdoba, Argentina